Michael Metz (born 16 June 1964) is a former field hockey player from Germany, who won the silver medal at the 1988 Summer Olympics in Seoul, South Korea for West Germany. Four years later, when Barcelona, Spain hosted the Summer Olympics, he was a member of the Men's National Team that captured the gold medal.

References
 databaseOlympics

External links
 

1964 births
Living people
Field hockey players at the 1988 Summer Olympics
Field hockey players at the 1992 Summer Olympics
German male field hockey players
Olympic field hockey players of Germany
Olympic gold medalists for Germany
Olympic silver medalists for West Germany
Place of birth missing (living people)
Olympic medalists in field hockey
Medalists at the 1992 Summer Olympics
Medalists at the 1988 Summer Olympics
20th-century German people